Oddrun Helene Hokland (née Lange; 29 November 1942 – 18 March 2022) was a Norwegian athlete. She competed in long jump and pentathlon at the 1964 Summer Olympics in Tokyo and finished 16th in both events.

Hailing from Vistdal, she represented the clubs Vistdal IL, SK Olymp, and BUL, Oslo. Between 1961 and 1966 she won a total of 22 individual national titles, in the disciplines pentathlon, javelin throw, long jump, high jump, 400 m, and 80 m hurdles. She set Norwegian records in long jump and high jump.

Hokland was a board member of the Norwegian Athletics Association and of the Norwegian Agrarian Association.

References

External links

1942 births
2022 deaths
Norwegian pentathletes
Norwegian female long jumpers
Norwegian high jumpers
Norwegian sprinters
People from Nesset
Athletes (track and field) at the 1964 Summer Olympics
Olympic athletes of Norway
Sportspeople from Møre og Romsdal
20th-century Norwegian women